Gibberifera simplana, the least bell, is a species of moth of the family Tortricidae. It is found in China (Hebei, Jilin, Henan, Hubei, Hunan, Shaanxi, Gansu), Taiwan, Korea, Japan, Russia and Europe, where it has been recorded from Great Britain, France, the Benelux, Germany, Denmark, Austria, Switzerland, Italy, the Czech Republic, Slovakia, Poland, Hungary, Romania, Norway, Sweden, Finland and the Baltic region.

The wingspan is 14–16 mm. Adults are on wing from May to July.

The larvae feed on Populus tremula and Salix species. They feed within a spun leaf on a terminal shoot of their host plant. Larvae can be found from August to September. Pupation takes place in a turned-down edge of a leaf, which then falls to the ground where the species overwinters in the pupal stage.

References

Moths described in 1836
Eucosmini
Taxa named by Josef Emanuel Fischer von Röslerstamm